Yulianna Yurievna Karaulova (born April 24, 1988 in Moscow) is a Russian singer, former lead singer of 5sta Family, and a former finalist of Fabrika Zvyozd 5.

Biography 
Karaulova was born in Moscow on April 24, 1988. When she was four years old, her father was sent to the diplomatic service in Bulgaria, so she and her family moved to the country's capital, Sofia. She studied at the School of the Russian Embassy in Bulgaria. At the age of 11, she returned to Moscow and finished school there.

In 2003, Karaulova placed second in the "Person of the Year" competition organized by a local teen magazine Yes!. She eventually became one of the singers of the Yes! musical group.

In 2004, she became a member of the Channel One Russia "Fabrika Zvyozd 5" under the direction of Alla Pugacheva, and reached the finals. By the end of the project, Karaulova joined a new group of Maxim Fadeev's Netsuke.

After the "Fabrika Zvyozd", she studied in London for six months, while occasionally working as an editor for the Yes! magazine.

In 2011, Karaulova became a soloist of the group "5sta Family". During 4 years of staying there, the band recorded several hits and won a number of prestigious nominations and awards, including Golden Gramophone Award 2013.

In 2014, Karaulova graduated from the producer faculty Gnessin State Musical College, having previously graduated from the faculty of pop-jazz vocal academy.

On September 20, 2015, Karaulova announced her departure from "5sta Family" to begin a solo career.

References

External links
 Official Website
   
 Instagram

1988 births
21st-century Russian women singers
21st-century Russian singers
Living people
Singers from Moscow
Fabrika Zvyozd
Gnessin State Musical College alumni
Russian activists against the 2022 Russian invasion of Ukraine
Russian pop singers
Russian women television presenters
Winners of the Golden Gramophone Award